Patty Rosborough is an American stand-up comedian, actor, and television writer. From 1990 to 1993, she co-hosted Short Attention Span Theater with Jon Stewart. Her stand-up comedy has been televised on Comedy Central, A&E, Showtime, and VH1. Her film credits include minor roles in Jacob's Ladder (1990) and Goodbye Baby (2007).

Rosborough has appeared on the stand-up comedy television series The World Stands Up, and headlined at Just for Laughs, an international comedy festival in Montreal. In 2000, she and Tammy Pescatelli won Ladies of Laughter, a stand-up comedy competition hosted in the Northeastern United States.

References

External links
 
 
 
 
 

Actresses from New York (state)
American television writers
American women comedians
Living people
American women television writers
Year of birth missing (living people)
Place of birth missing (living people)
Comedians from New York (state)
21st-century American women